John Jackson (born 26 June 1952) is a former speedway rider from England.

Speedway career 
Jackson rode in the top two tiers of British Speedway from 1970 to 1983, riding for various clubs. He was instrumental in helping the Crewe Kings to win the league title during the 1972 British League Division Two season. He consistently appeared in the leading averages throughout the 1970s.

References 

Living people
1952 births
British speedway riders
Crewe Kings riders
Ellesmere Port Gunners riders
Halifax Dukes riders
King's Lynn Stars riders
Oxford Cheetahs riders
Stoke Potters riders
Wolverhampton Wolves riders